"La Plage de Saint Tropez" is a 1993 song recorded by Swedish group Army of Lovers. It was released as the second single from their third album, The Gods of Earth and Heaven (1993), and peaked at number 17 in Flanders and number 83 in Germany. A music video was made, directed by Swedish director Fredrik Boklund, who also directed the other videos for the band.

Critical reception
Swedish newspaper Göteborgsposten stated in their review of The Gods of Earth and Heaven, that the song is "another hit", adding it as a "schlager-built song with a fast rhythm". A reviewer from Music & Media described it as "a souped-up version of 'fat' Elvis' 'My Boy'".

Single track listing

Charts

References

 

Songs about beaches
Songs about cities
Songs about France
Saint-Tropez in fiction
1993 singles
1993 songs
Army of Lovers songs
Music videos directed by Fredrik Boklund
Number-one singles in France
Polydor Records singles
Songs written by Alexander Bard
Stockholm Records singles